FC Gorubso (ФК Горубсо) is a Bulgarian football club from the town of Madan, Bulgaria, currently playing in the Bulgarian V AFG, the third division of Bulgarian football. Its home matches take place at the Gorubso Stadium.

History
The club was officially founded in 1947 under the name FC "Rodopski Minyor". In 1963 the club called FC Gorubso. Club colors are yellow and black. During 1961–62 season the team took first place in Bulgarian V AFG, thus qualified in the Bulgarian B Professional Football Group for the upcoming season. Season 1962-63 was a first for the club in Bulgarian second division. The club from Madan have 15 seasons in B PFG.

Gorubso
1947 establishments in Bulgaria
Association football clubs established in 1947